Ariarne Elizabeth Titmus,  (born 7 September 2000) is an Australian swimmer. She is the reigning Olympic champion in the women's 200-metre and 400-metre freestyle, having won both events at the 2020 Summer Olympics, the world record holder in the long course 400-metre freestyle, and formerly the world record holder in the short course 400-metre freestyle. In 2019 and 2020, she competed representing the Cali Condors in the International Swimming League.

Background
In 2015, Titmus and her family, including father Steve Titmus, moved from Tasmania to Queensland for better training opportunities.

Titmus is coached by Dean Boxall. He has been a swim coach for more than twenty years and currently leads the swim club St Peters Western based in Brisbane. St Peters Western has had many famous swimmers in the club such as Stephanie Rice and Leisel Jones.

Career
At the 2016 Junior Pan Pacific Swimming Championships, held in August in Hawaii, United States, Titmus won a silver medal in the 4×200 metre freestyle relay, splitting a 2:00.13 for the lead-off leg of the relay to contribute to the final time of 8:05.43, and a bronze medal in the 400 metre freestyle with a time of 4:09.81, which was 2.29 seconds behind gold medalist Li Bingjie of China.

Titmus competed in the women's 200-metre freestyle event at the 2017 World Aquatics Championships, finishing in 17th place.

At the 2018 Commonwealth Games, Titmus won three gold medals; in the 400 metre freestyle, 800 metre freestyle and the 4 x 200-metre freestyle relay. She also won a silver medal in the 200 metre freestyle.

On 14 December 2018, Titmus set a new world record and won a gold medal in the women's short course 400-metre freestyle competition of the 2018 FINA World Swimming Championships with a time of 3:53.92, breaking the record set by Wang Jianjiahe two months earlier by 0.05 seconds. She won a further gold medal in the 200 metre freestyle and two bronze medals in relay events at this competition.

Titmus was selected as one of the 27 swimmers to represent Australia at the 2019 World Aquatics Championships in Gwangju, South Korea. After finishing second in her heat of the women's 400-metre freestyle, she won the gold medal and broke the Oceania record in the final with a time of 3:58.76, a full second ahead of American swimmer Katie Ledecky. In the 4×200 metre freestyle relay the Australian team broke the world record setting a time of 7:41.50 with Titmus swimming the first leg.

In 2019, Titmus was a member of the inaugural International Swimming League, representing the Cali Condors, who finished in third place in the final match in Las Vegas, Nevada, in December. Titmus won the 400-metre freestyle several times throughout the season, including the final.

In 2021, Titmus won two gold medals for Australia at the 2020 Summer Olympics in Tokyo. Posting a time of 3:56.69 in the 400-metre freestyle final, she edged out world record holder Ledecky by less than a second. Posting a new Olympic Record of 1:53.50 in the 200-metre freestyle final, she trailed behind Hong Kong’s Siobhan Haughey for most of the race then came home strongly to push herself in front on the last lap. Titmus earned a silver medal in the 800-metre freestyle final, this time finishing 1.26 seconds behind Katie Ledecky. Titmus was also part of the relay team that won bronze in the 4 x 200 metre women's freestyle relay, finishing behind China and the US.

At the 2022 Australian Swimming Championships in May, Titmus set a new world record in the long course 400-metre freestyle with a time of 3:56.40, breaking the former record of 3:56.46 set by Katie Ledecky in 2016.

Results in major championships

Career best times

Long course metres (50 m pool)

Short course metres (25 m pool)

World records

Long course metres

 split 1:54.27 (1st leg); with Madison Wilson (2nd leg), Brianna Throssell (3rd leg), Emma McKeon (4th leg)
 split 1:52.82 (4th leg); with Madison Wilson (1st leg), Kiah Melverton (2nd leg), Mollie O'Callaghan (3rd leg)

Short course metres

Olympic records

Long course metres

Awards and honours
 Swimming Australia, Swimmer of the Year: 2019
 Swimming Australia, Short Course Swimmer of the Year: 2019
 Swimming Australia, Patron's Award: 2019
 SwimSwam, Top 100 (Women's): 2021 (#10), 2022 (#3)
 Olympics.com, Top 5 Moments: Swimming at the 2020 Summer Olympics (#1)
 Medal of the Order of Australia, 2022
 Nominee for Laureus World Sports Award in Breakthrough of the Year: 2022
Launceston City Council name Aquatic Centre competition pool - Ariarne Titmus Competition Pool.
Nike commission large mural at the Launceston Aquatic Centre by artist Josh Foley.

References

External links
 

2000 births
Living people
Australian female freestyle swimmers
Commonwealth Games gold medallists for Australia
Commonwealth Games medallists in swimming
Commonwealth Games silver medallists for Australia
Medalists at the 2020 Summer Olympics
Olympic gold medalists in swimming
Olympic gold medalists for Australia
Sportspeople from Launceston, Tasmania
Sportswomen from Tasmania
Swimmers at the 2018 Commonwealth Games
World Aquatics Championships medalists in swimming
Swimmers at the 2020 Summer Olympics
Olympic swimmers of Australia
Olympic silver medalists in swimming
Olympic bronze medalists in swimming
Olympic silver medalists for Australia
Olympic bronze medalists for Australia
Recipients of the Medal of the Order of Australia
21st-century Australian women
Swimmers at the 2022 Commonwealth Games
Commonwealth Games competitors for Australia
Medallists at the 2018 Commonwealth Games
Medallists at the 2022 Commonwealth Games